Karen Percy Lowe (born October 10, 1966) is a Canadian former alpine skier. She was born in Banff, Alberta. She won 2 bronze medals in skiing at the 1988 Calgary Winter Olympics, where she was Canada's flag bearer in the closing ceremony.  Until her retirement from the National team in August 1990, she competed in 107 races on the World Cup circuit with 25-top 10 finishes, four World Championships including two Junior World Championships, and 7 consecutive Canadian National Championships from 1983 to 1989.

Honours 
In 1988, she was a recipient of Canada's highest award when she became a Member of the Order of Canada, followed, in 1989, by an Olympic Champion award at The Tribute to the Champions.

Personal life 
Percy is married to former Edmonton Oilers player, and current Director of Hockey for the Edmonton Oilers, Kevin Lowe. Their son Keegan is currently playing with HC Bolzano in the ICE Hockey League (ICEHL).

References

External links
 Canadian Ski Hall of Fame biodata

1966 births
Living people
Alpine skiers at the 1988 Winter Olympics
Canadian female alpine skiers
Olympic alpine skiers of Canada
Olympic bronze medalists for Canada
People from Banff, Alberta
Sportspeople from Alberta
Olympic medalists in alpine skiing
Medalists at the 1988 Winter Olympics
Members of the Order of Canada